The National Museum of Tajikistan is a museum in Dushanbe, the capital city of Tajikistan.

Area and departments 
The museum has a total area of 24 000 meters2, of which over 15 000 m2 are exhibition halls. It is composed of four exhibition departments—Department of Natural History, Department of Ancient and Medieval History, Department of Modern and Contemporary History, and Department of Fine and Applied Arts.

Gallery

References

External links 

 
 

Museums in Tajikistan
Buildings and structures in Dushanbe
National museums
Museums established in 1934
1934 establishments in the Soviet Union